Khüchü (or Köchü, Konchi, Konichi) was the Khan of the White Horde between c. 1280–1302. He was the eldest son of Sartaqtay and Qujiyan of the Qongirat and a grandson of Orda Khan.

Marco Polo says Köchü had a vast number of people, but he carried on no war with anybody, and his people lived in great tranquility. Since 1280 he sent friendly letter to Kublai Khan, and the Yuan dynasty rewarded him a large amount of grains and other valuable things of China in turn for his alliance. According to Rashid-al-Din Hamadani, he also kept a very friendly relationship with his relatives, the Ilkhanate, in Persia. According to Rashid al-Din Hamadani, Köchü allied with Kaidu.

Köchü possessed the territory of Ghazna and Bamiyan under the suzerainty of either the Chagatayid Khans or the Ilkhan. However, he proved his alliance and refused when Baraq, ruler of Chagatai Khanate, demanded him to give up the authority of those areas before his attack on Iran in 1269.

He was an influential khan. When the Borjigin princes, who operated on Kublai's behalf in Central Asia and later on rebelled, fought against each other, they appealed to Köchü. In c. 1302 he died because he was overweight.

Genealogy
Genghis Khan
Jochi
Orda Khan
Sartaqtay
Köchü

See also
List of Khans of the Golden Horde

References

Nomadic groups in Eurasia
Khans of the White Horde
13th-century monarchs in Asia
Borjigin
13th-century Mongol rulers